Christopher Wandesford, 2nd Viscount Castlecomer (2 March 1684 – 23 June 1719) was an Irish politician who sat in the Parliament of Ireland in 1707 and in the British House of Commons between 1710 and 1719.

Wandesford was the son of Christopher Wandesford, 1st Viscount Castlecomer. He was educated at Trinity College, Dublin in 1702.

Wandesford served as the Member of Parliament for  St Canice in the Parliament of Ireland between July and September 1707. He also succeeded to his father's titles on 15 September 1707. On 25 April 1710 he was made a member of the Privy Council of Ireland and was Governor of Kilkenny from 1715.

At the 1710 British general election, Wandesford was returned to Parliament as MP for Morpeth but lost the seat in 1713. At the 1715 general election he was returned as MP for Ripon and sat until his death in 1719. He was Secretary at War in 1718.

Castlecomer married Hon. Frances Pelham, daughter of Thomas Pelham, 1st Baron Pelham and Lady Grace Holles, on 31 May 1715. He died aged 35 and was succeeded by his only child, Christopher.

References

1684 births
1719 deaths
Alumni of Trinity College Dublin
Members of the Parliament of Great Britain for English constituencies
Members of the Privy Council of Ireland
Wandesford, Christopher
British MPs 1710–1713
British MPs 1715–1722
18th-century Anglo-Irish people
Members of the Parliament of Ireland (pre-1801) for County Kilkenny constituencies